The R206 road is a regional road in Ireland, located in the border region of County Cavan.

References

Regional roads in the Republic of Ireland
Roads in County Cavan